Moviefone is an American-based moving pictures listing and information service. Moviegoers can obtain local showtimes, cinema information, film reviews, and advance tickets, as well as TV content and a comprehensive search tool that allows users to find theaters, channels, and streaming services offering movies and television shows. The service is owned by Born in Cleveland LLC, Cleveland O'Neal III's holding company. O'Neal is creator and producer of Made in Hollywood syndicated daytime entertainment show.

History
In 1989, Russ Leatherman, Rob Gukeisen, Andrew Jarecki, Pat Cardamone, and Adam Slutsky launched the interactive telephone service, with initial service in Los Angeles and New York City. Leatherman provided the voice of "Mr. Moviefone" for the automated phone service. After gaining popularity, the service later expanded across the United States and eventually adopted an online presence as Moviefone.com.

In 1999, AOL  purchased Moviefone for $388 million. The acquisition was completed on May 21, 1999.

In 2001, Moviefone entered into a partnership with MovieTickets.com that crosslinked their ticketing offerings; by 2004, Moviefone's online arm was acquired outright by MovieTickets.com. However, in 2012, Moviefone announced a partnership with MovieTickets.com's rival Fandango.

On February 23, 2014, it was reported that Moviefone would be shutting down its call-in service and its "777-FILM" phone number, but would maintain its mobile app services.

On May 5, 2014, Moviefone was relaunched with a new look, an expansion into TV content, and a comprehensive search tool that allows users to find theaters, channels, and streaming services offering movies and television shows.

On April 5, 2018, Helios and Matheson Analytics, the majority owner of the movie ticketing service MoviePass, announced the acquisition of Moviefone from Oath Inc. for $1 million in cash and $8 million in stock.

In early 2020, Helios and Matheson went bankrupt in deep controversy over multiple changes to the MoviePass service, and at that point had one employee, Matt Atchity, handling Moviefone. The company was worth just $4,379,504, or about 1% of the 388 million when it was purchased by AOL. Made in Hollywood Producer Cleveland O’Neal III purchased Moviefone out of bankruptcy in March 2020 via his holding company, Born in Cleveland LLC.

In popular culture

In the Seinfeld episode, "The Pool Guy" (season 7, episode 8), the character Cosmo Kramer receives misdialed calls meant for a parodied Moviefone after getting a new phone number.

In an episode of the TV series of Dilbert, the Pointy-haired Boss confuses Moviefone with an automated hotline for checking his stocks, being frustrated that trying to check his IBM stock leads to buying tickets to a  horror movie.

In the 2001 film Josie and the Pussycats, Mr. Moviefone is the voice of subliminal advertising messages planted into pop music by an ominous record agency.

References

External links

 List of U.S. states with Moviefone local numbers.

American film websites
Information by telephone
American companies established in 1989
Internet properties established in 1989
2018 mergers and acquisitions